Shahrdari Bandar Anzali F.C.  is an Iranian football club based in Bandar-e Anzali, Iran. They competed in the 2010–11 Iran Football's 2nd Division.

Season-by-Season

The table below chronicles the achievements of Shahrdari Bandar Anzali in various competitions since 2007.

Chairman
 Soheil Mirzajani

See also
 Hazfi Cup
 Iran Football's 2nd Division 2010–11

References

External links
 Official Website

Football clubs in Iran
1999 establishments in Iran